State Route 167 (SR 167) is part of Maine's system of numbered state highways.  It runs  from an intersection with U.S. Route 1 (US 1A) in Presque Isle to a junction with US 1A in Fort Fairfield.

The route was originally designated in 1925, and ran between Lincoln and the Canada–United States border at Vanceboro. In 1936, the number was given to a route between Presque Isle and Fort Fairfield. At the time, SR 167 shared part of its alignment with SR 163, but was eventually moved to its own route. In 1940, with the designation of US 1A over an old section of SR 161, the orphaned section of SR 161 between Fort Fairfield and the border was renumbered to SR 167. The pavement entered Canada as New Brunswick Route 190. SR 161 has since been returned to its original routing past Fort Fairfield therefore truncating SR 167 to US 1A.

Major junctions

References

External links

Floodgap Roadgap's RoadsAroundME: Maine State Route 167

167
Transportation in Aroostook County, Maine